Post-punk (originally called new musick) is a broad genre of rock music that emerged in the late 1970s in the wake of punk rock. Post-punk musicians departed from punk's traditional elements and raw simplicity, instead adopting a broader, more experimental approach that encompassed a variety of avant-garde sensibilities and non-rock influences. Inspired by punk's energy and DIY ethic but determined to break from rock cliches, artists experimented with styles like funk, electronic music, jazz, and dance music; the production techniques of dub and disco; and ideas from art and politics, including critical theory, modernist art, cinema and literature. These communities produced independent record labels, visual art, multimedia performances and fanzines.

The early post-punk vanguard was represented by groups including Siouxsie and the Banshees, Wire, Public Image Ltd, the Pop Group, Cabaret Voltaire, Magazine, Pere Ubu, Joy Division, Talking Heads, Devo, Gang of Four, the Slits, the Cure, and the Fall. The movement was closely related to the development of ancillary genres such as gothic rock, neo-psychedelia, no wave, and industrial music. By the mid-1980s, post-punk had dissipated, but it provided a foundation for the New Pop movement and the later alternative and independent genres.

Definition

Post-punk is a diverse genre that emerged from the cultural milieu of punk rock in the late 1970s. Originally called "new musick", the terms were first used by various writers in the late 1970s to describe groups moving beyond punk's garage rock template and into disparate areas. Sounds writer Jon Savage already used "post-punk" in early 1978. NME writer Paul Morley also stated that he had "possibly" invented the term himself. At the time, there was a feeling of renewed excitement regarding what the word would entail, with Sounds publishing numerous preemptive editorials on new musick. Towards the end of the decade, some journalists used "art punk" as a pejorative for garage rock-derived acts deemed too sophisticated and out of step with punk's dogma. Before the early 1980s, many groups now categorized as "post-punk" were subsumed under the broad umbrella of "new wave", with the terms being deployed interchangeably. "Post-punk" became differentiated from "new wave" after their styles perceptibly narrowed.

The writer Nicholas Lezard described the term "post-punk" as "so multifarious that only the broadest use ... is possible". Subsequent discourse has failed to clarify whether contemporary music journals and fanzines conventionally understood "post-punk" the way that it was discussed in later years. Music historian Clinton Heylin places the "true starting-point for English post-punk" somewhere between August 1977 and May 1978, with the arrival of guitarist John McKay in Siouxsie and the Banshees in July 1977, Magazine's first album, Wire's new musical direction in 1978 and the formation of Public Image Ltd. Music historian Simon Goddard wrote that the debut albums of those bands layered the foundations of post-punk.

Simon Reynolds' 2005 book Rip It Up and Start Again is widely referenced as post-punk doctrine, although he has stated that the book only covers aspects of post-punk that he had a personal inclination toward. Wilkinson characterized Reynolds' readings as "apparent revisionism and 'rebranding. Author/musician Alex Ogg criticized: "The problem is not with what Reynolds left out of Rip It Up ..., but, paradoxically, that too much was left in". Ogg suggested that post-punk pertains to a set of artistic sensibilities and approaches rather than any unifying style, and disputed the accuracy of the term's chronological prefix "post", as various groups commonly labeled "post-punk" predate the punk rock movement. Reynolds defined the post-punk era as occurring roughly between 1978 and 1984. He advocated that post-punk be conceived as "less a genre of music than a space of possibility", suggesting that "what unites all this activity is a set of open-ended imperatives: innovation; willful oddness; the willful jettisoning of all things precedented or 'rock'n'roll. AllMusic employs "post-punk" to denote "a more adventurous and arty form of punk".

Reynolds asserted that the post-punk period produced significant innovations and music on its own. Reynolds described the period as "a fair match for the sixties in terms of the sheer amount of great music created, the spirit of adventure and idealism that infused it, and the way that the music seemed inextricably connected to the political and social turbulence of its era". Nicholas Lezard wrote that the music of the period "was avant-garde, open to any musical possibilities that suggested themselves, united only in the sense that it was very often cerebral, concocted by brainy young men and women interested as much in disturbing the audience, or making them think, as in making a pop song".

Characteristics
Many post-punk artists were initially inspired by punk's DIY ethic and energy, but ultimately became disillusioned with the style and movement, feeling that it had fallen into a commercial formula, rock convention, and self-parody. They repudiated its populist claims to accessibility and raw simplicity, instead of seeing an opportunity to break with musical tradition, subvert commonplaces and challenge audiences. Artists moved beyond punk's focus on the concerns of a largely white, male, working-class population and abandoned its continued reliance on established rock and roll tropes, such as three-chord progressions and Chuck Berry-based guitar riffs. These artists instead defined punk as "an imperative to constant change", believing that "radical content demands radical form".

Though the music varied widely between regions and artists, the post-punk movement has been characterized by its "conceptual assault" on rock conventions and rejection of aesthetics perceived of as traditionalist, hegemonic or rockist in favor of experimentation with production techniques and non-rock musical styles such as dub, funk, electronic music, disco, noise, world music, and the avant-garde. Some previous musical styles also served as touchstones for the movement, including particular brands of krautrock, glam, art rock, art pop and other music from the 1960s. Artists once again approached the studio as an instrument, using new recording methods and pursuing novel sonic territories. Author Matthew Bannister wrote that post-punk artists rejected the high cultural references of 1960s rock artists like the Beatles and Bob Dylan as well as paradigms that defined "rock as progressive, as art, as 'sterile' studio perfectionism ... by adopting an avant-garde aesthetic". According to musicologist Pete Dale, while groups wanted to "rip up history and start again", the music was still "inevitably tied to traces they could never fully escape".

Nicholas Lezard described post-punk as "a fusion of art and music". The era saw the robust appropriation of ideas from literature, art, cinema, philosophy, politics and critical theory into musical and pop cultural contexts. Artists sought to refuse the common distinction between high and low culture and returned to the art school tradition found in the work of artists such as Roxy Music and David Bowie. Reynolds noted a preoccupation among some post-punk artists with issues such as alienation, repression, and technocracy of Western modernity. Among major influences on a variety of post-punk artists were writers William S. Burroughs and J. G. Ballard, avant-garde political scenes such as Situationism and Dada, and intellectual movements such as postmodernism. Many artists viewed their work in explicitly political terms. Additionally, in some locations, the creation of post-punk music was closely linked to the development of efficacious subcultures, which played important roles in the production of art, multimedia performances, fanzines and independent labels related to the music. Many post-punk artists maintained an anti-corporatist approach to recording and instead seized on alternate means of producing and releasing music. Journalists also became an important element of the culture, and popular music magazines and critics became immersed in the movement.

1977–1979: Early years

Background

During the punk era, a variety of entrepreneurs interested in local punk-influenced music scenes began founding independent record labels, including Rough Trade (founded by record shop owner Geoff Travis), Factory (founded by Manchester-based television personality Tony Wilson), and Fast Product (co-founded by Bob Last and Hilary Morrison). By 1977, groups began pointedly pursuing methods of releasing music independently, an idea disseminated in particular by Buzzcocks' release of their Spiral Scratch EP on their own label as well as the self-released 1977 singles of Desperate Bicycles. These DIY imperatives would help form the production and distribution infrastructure of post-punk and the indie music scene that later blossomed in the mid-1980s.

As the initial punk movement dwindled, vibrant new scenes began to coalesce out of a variety of bands pursuing experimental sounds and wider conceptual territory in their work. By late 1977, British acts like Siouxsie and the Banshees and Wire were experimenting with sounds, lyrics, and aesthetics that differed significantly from their punk contemporaries. Savage described some of these early developments as exploring "harsh urban scrapings", "controlled white noise" and "massively accented drumming". Mojo editor Pat Gilbert said, "The first truly post-punk band were Siouxsie and the Banshees", noting the influence of the band's use of repetition on Joy Division. John Robb similarly argued that the very first Banshees gig was "proto post-punk" due to the hypnotic rhythm section. In January 1978, singer John Lydon (then known as Johnny Rotten) announced the break-up of his pioneering punk band the Sex Pistols, citing his disillusionment with punk's musical predictability and cooption by commercial interests, as well as his desire to explore more diverse territory. In May, Lydon formed the group Public Image Ltd with guitarist Keith Levene and bassist Jah Wobble, the latter who declared "rock is obsolete" after citing reggae as a "natural influence". However, Lydon described his new sound as "total pop with deep meanings. But I don't want to be categorised in any other term but punk! That's where I come from and that's where I'm staying."

United Kingdom

Around this time, acts such as Public Image Ltd, The Pop Group and The Slits had begun experimenting with dance music, dub production techniques and the avant-garde, while punk-indebted Manchester acts such as Joy Division, The Fall, The Durutti Column and A Certain Ratio developed unique styles that drew on a similarly disparate range of influences across music and modernist art. Bands such as Scritti Politti, Gang of Four, Essential Logic and This Heat incorporated leftist political philosophy and their own art school studies in their work. The unorthodox studio production techniques devised by producers such as Steve Lillywhite, Martin Hannett, and Dennis Bovell became important element of the emerging music. Labels such as Rough Trade and Factory would become important hubs for these groups and help facilitate releases, artwork, performances, and promotion.

Credit for the first post-punk record is disputed, but strong contenders include the debuts of Magazine ("Shot by Both Sides", January 1978), Siouxsie and the Banshees ("Hong Kong Garden", August 1978), Public Image Ltd ("Public Image", October 1978), Cabaret Voltaire (Extended Play, November 1978) and Gang of Four ("Damaged Goods", December 1978).

A variety of groups that predated punk, such as Cabaret Voltaire and Throbbing Gristle, experimented with tape machines and electronic instruments in tandem with performance art methods and influence from transgressive literature, ultimately helping to pioneer industrial music. Throbbing Gristle's independent label Industrial Records would become a hub for this scene and provide it with its namesake. A pioneering punk scene in Australia during the mid-1970s also fostered influential post-punk acts like The Birthday Party, who eventually relocated to the UK to join its burgeoning music scene.

As these scenes began to develop, British music publications such as NME and Sounds  developed an influential part in the nascent post-punk culture, with writers like Savage, Paul Morley and Ian Penman developing a dense (and often playful) style of criticism that drew on philosophy, radical politics and an eclectic variety of other sources. In 1978, UK magazine Sounds celebrated albums such as Siouxsie and the Banshees' The Scream, Wire's Chairs Missing, and American band Pere Ubu's Dub Housing. In 1979, NME championed records such as PiL's Metal Box, Joy Division's Unknown Pleasures, Gang of Four's Entertainment!, Wire's 154, the Raincoats' self-titled debut, and American group Talking Heads' album Fear of Music.

Siouxsie and the Banshees, Joy Division, Bauhaus and The Cure were the main post-punk bands who shifted to dark overtones in their music, which would later spawn the gothic rock scene in the early 1980s. Members of Siouxsie and the Banshees and the Cure worked on records and toured together regularly until 1984. Neo-psychedelia grew out of the British post-punk scene in the late 1970s. The genre later flourished into a more widespread and international movement of artists who applied the spirit of psychedelic rock to new sounds and techniques. Other styles such as avant-funk and industrial dub also emerged around 1979.

United States

In the mid-1970s, various American groups (some with ties to Downtown Manhattan's punk scene, including Television and Suicide) had begun expanding on the vocabulary of punk music. Midwestern groups such as Pere Ubu and Devo drew inspiration from the region's derelict industrial environments, employing conceptual art techniques,  and unconventional verbal styles that would presage the post-punk movement by several years. A variety of subsequent groups, including the Boston-based Mission of Burma and the New York-based Talking Heads, combined elements of punk with art school sensibilities. In 1978, the latter band began a series of collaborations with British ambient pioneer and ex-Roxy Music member Brian Eno, experimenting with Dadaist lyrical techniques, electronic sounds, and African polyrhythms. San Francisco's vibrant post-punk scene was centered on such groups as Chrome, the Residents, Tuxedomoon and MX-80, whose influences extended to multimedia experimentation, cabaret and the dramatic theory of Antonin Artaud's Theater of Cruelty.

Also emerging during this period was downtown New York's no wave movement, a short-lived art, and music scene that began in part as a reaction against punk's recycling of traditionalist rock tropes and often reflected an abrasive, confrontational and nihilistic worldview. No wave musicians such as The Contortions, Teenage Jesus and the Jerks, Mars, DNA, Theoretical Girls, and Rhys Chatham instead experimented with noise, dissonance and atonality in addition to non-rock styles. The former four groups were included on the Eno-produced No New York compilation (1978), often considered the quintessential testament to the scene. The decadent parties and art installations of venues such as Club 57 and the Mudd Club would become cultural hubs for musicians and visual artists alike, with figures such as Jean-Michel Basquiat, Keith Haring and Michael Holman frequenting the scene. According to Village Voice writer Steve Anderson, the scene pursued an abrasive reductionism that "undermined the power and mystique of a rock vanguard by depriving it of a tradition to react against". Anderson claimed that the no wave scene represented "New York's last stylistically cohesive avant-rock movement".

1980–1984: Further developments

UK scene and commercial ambitions

British post-punk entered the 1980s with support from members of the critical community—American critic Greil Marcus characterised "Britain's postpunk pop avant-garde" in a 1980 Rolling Stone article as "sparked by a tension, humour and sense of paradox plainly unique in present-day pop music"—as well as media figures such as BBC DJ John Peel, while several groups, such as PiL and Joy Division, achieved some success in the popular charts. The network of supportive record labels that included Y Records, Industrial, Fast, E.G., Mute, Axis/4AD, and Glass continued to facilitate a large output of music. By 1980–1981, many British acts, including Maximum Joy, Magazine, Essential Logic, Killing Joke, The Sound, 23 Skidoo, Alternative TV, the Teardrop Explodes, The Psychedelic Furs, Echo & the Bunnymen and The Membranes also became part of these fledgling post-punk scenes, which centered on cities such as London and Manchester.

However, during this period, major figures and artists in the scene began leaning away from underground aesthetics. In the music press, the increasingly esoteric writing of post-punk publications soon began to alienate their readerships; it is estimated that within several years, NME suffered the loss of half its circulation. Writers like Morley began advocating "overground brightness" instead of the experimental sensibilities promoted in the early years. Morley's own musical collaboration with engineer Gary Langan and programmer J. J. Jeczalik, the Art of Noise, would attempt to bring sampled and electronic sounds to the pop mainstream. Post-punk artists such as Scritti Politti's Green Gartside and Josef K's Paul Haig, previously engaged in avant-garde practices, turned away from these approaches and pursued mainstream styles and commercial success. These new developments, in which post-punk artists attempted to bring subversive ideas into the pop mainstream, began to be categorized under the marketing term New Pop.

Several more pop-oriented groups, including ABC, the Associates, Adam and the Ants and Bow Wow Wow (the latter two managed by former Sex Pistols manager Malcolm McLaren) emerged in tandem with the development of the New Romantic subcultural scene. Emphasizing glamour, fashion and escapism in distinction to the experimental seriousness of earlier post-punk groups, the club-oriented scene drew some suspicion from denizens of the movement but also achieved commercial success. Artists such as Gary Numan, Depeche Mode, the Human League, Soft Cell, John Foxx and Visage helped pioneer a new synthpop style that drew more heavily from electronic and synthesizer music and benefited from the rise of MTV.

Downtown Manhattan

In the early 1980s, Downtown Manhattan's no wave scene transitioned from its abrasive origins into a more dance-oriented sound, with compilations such as ZE Records' Mutant Disco (1981) highlighting a newly playful sensibility borne out of the city's clash of hip hop, disco and punk styles, as well as dub reggae and world music influences. Artists such as ESG, Liquid Liquid, The B-52s, Cristina, Arthur Russell, James White and the Blacks, and Lizzy Mercier Descloux pursued a formula described by Lucy Sante as "anything at all + disco bottom". Other no wave-indebted artists such as Swans, Glenn Branca, Lydia Lunch, the Lounge Lizards, Bush Tetras, and Sonic Youth instead continued exploring the early scene's forays into noise and more abrasive territory.

Mid-1980s: Decline
The original post-punk movement ended as the bands associated with the movement turned away from its aesthetics, often in favor of more commercial sounds (such as new wave). Many of these groups would continue recording as part of the new pop movement, with entryism becoming a popular concept. In the United States, driven by MTV and modern rock radio stations, a number of post-punk acts had an influence on or became part of the Second British Invasion of "New Music" there. Some shifted to a more commercial new wave sound (such as Gang of Four), while others were fixtures on American college radio and became early examples of alternative rock, such as Athens, Georgia band R.E.M. One band to emerge from post-punk was U2, which infused elements of religious imagery and political commentary into its often anthemic music.

Online database AllMusic stated scattered [late-80s] bands like Big Flame, World Domination Enterprises, and Minimal Compact, all seem like natural extensions of post-punk.

Post-1980s

1990s 
Some notable bands that recalled the original era during the 1990's included Six Finger Satellite, Brainiac, and Elastica.

2000s: Revival 

In the early 2000s, a new group of bands that played a stripped down and back-to-basics version of guitar rock emerged into the mainstream, these bands included Interpol, Franz Ferdinand, The Strokes, and The Rapture. They were variously characterized as part of a post-punk revival, alongside a garage rock revival and a new wave revival. The music ranged from the atonal tracks of bands like Liars to the melodic pop songs of groups like The Sounds, popularising distorted guitar sounds.  They shared an emphasis on energetic live performance and used aesthetics (in hair and clothes) closely aligned with their fans, often drawing on fashion of the 1950s and 1960s, with "skinny ties, white belts [and] shag haircuts". There was an emphasis on "rock authenticity" that was seen as a reaction to the commercialism of MTV-oriented nu metal, hip hop and "bland" post-Britpop groups. Because the bands came from countries around the world, cited diverse influences and adopted differing styles of dress, their unity as a genre has been disputed. By the end of the decade, many of the bands of the movement had broken up, were on hiatus, or had moved into other musical areas, and very few were making significant impact on the charts.

2020s: "Crank wave" revival in the UK and Ireland 
During the late 2010s and early 2020s, a new wave of UK and Irish post-punk bands gained popularity. Terms such as "crank wave" and "post-Brexit new wave" have been used to describe these bands. The bands Black Country, New Road, Squid, Dry Cleaning, Shame, Sleaford Mods and Yard Act all had albums that charted in the top ten in the UK, while Idles' Ultra Mono, Fontaines D.C.'s Skinty Fia and Wet Leg's self-titled debut all reached number one on the UK album charts. This scene is rooted in experimental post-punk and often features vocalists who "tend to talk more than they sing, reciting lyrics in an alternately disaffected or tightly wound voice", and "sometimes it's more like post-rock". Several of these bands, including Black Country, New Road, Black Midi and Squid, began their careers by playing at The Windmill, an all-ages music venue in London's Brixton neighbourhood. Many of them have also worked with producer Dan Carey and have released music on his DIY label Speedy Wunderground.

List of bands

Notes

Citations

Bibliography

Further reading 
 Byron Coley and Thurston Moore, (2008) No Wave: Post-Punk. Underground. New York 1976–1980, Abrams
 
 
 Walker, Clinton (1982) Inner City Sound: Punk and Post-Punk in Australia, 1976-1985 Sydney: Wild & Woolley. 
 Walker, Clinton (1996) Stranded: The Secret History of Australian Independent Music 1977-1991, Sydney: Pan Macmillan.

External links 

 Post-punk at AllMusic
 Post-punk essay and sampler by Julian Cope

 
Punk rock genres
British styles of music
British rock music genres
1970s in music
1980s in music
20th-century music genres